Sanjay National Park (Guru Ghasidas National Park) is a national park in Koriya district of Chhattisgarh and Sidhi, Singrauli districts of Madhya Pradesh state, India. It is located in the Narmada Valley dry deciduous forests ecoregion.

Flora
The national park is mostly composed of tropical forests of Sakhua (Shorea robusta) trees (aka: śāl trees).

Fauna
The Bengal tiger, Indian leopard, Spotted deer, Sambar deer, wild boar, Nilgai, Chinkara, Civet, Porcupine, Monitor lizard, and 309 species of birds are found here. Among the many birds here are the Golden Hooded Oriole, Racket-tailed Drongo, Indian pitta, Rufous treepie, Lesser adjutant, Red-headed vulture, Cenareous vulture, White-rumped vulture, Egyptian vulture and Nightjar.

Sanjay-Dubri Tiger Reserve
All of Sanjay-Dubri Tiger Reserve used to be in Madhya Pradesh, before Chhattisgarh was carved out of it in 2000. A large part of this  area is now located in Chhattisgarh, which was renamed to "Guru Ghasidas National Park" by the Government of Chhattisgarh.

Chhattisgarh

The National Park is named after Guru Ghasidas. It shared five tigers with Madhya Pradesh in 2010. In addition, considering that what used to be Surguja State is now part of Chhattisgarh, and that the state has a district called 'Koriya', this overall area was the last known territory of the Asiatic cheetah in India.

Madhya Pradesh
The Tiger Reserve comprises Sanjay National Park and the Dubri Wildlife Sanctuary, both of which cover more than 831 km2, and are located in Sidhi District. The area, with its large size and rich biodiversity, is well-known. It has Sal, Bamboo and mixed forests.

According to an official census of Madhya Pradesh carried out in 2004, Sanjay National Park had six tigers. Eventually, however, no tiger was sighted there, between October 2008 and May 2009.

See also
 Flora and fauna of Madhya Pradesh
 Tamor Pingla Wildlife Sanctuary

References

Tiger reserves of India
National parks in Madhya Pradesh
Sidhi district
1983 establishments in Madhya Pradesh
Protected areas established in 1983